Vietnamellidae is a family of ephemerelloid mayflies. It contains a single extant genus, Vietnamella, with several species native to India, Southeast Asia, and China. A fossil genus Burmella is known from the Burmese amber of Myanmar, dating to the mid-Cretaceous around 100 million years ago.

Taxonomy 

 Vietnamella Tshernova, 1972
 V. thani Tshernova, 1972
 V. ornata Tshernova, 1972
 V. sinensis (Hsu, 1936)
 V. maculosa Auychinda et al. 2020
 V. nanensis Auychinda et al. 2020
 V. chebalingensis Tong, 2020
 Burmella Godunko, et al. 2021 Burmese amber, Myanmar, mid-Cretaceous (Albian-Cenomanian)
 B. paucivenosa Godunko, et al. 2021
 B. clypeata Godunko, et al. 2021

References 

Mayflies
Insect families
Taxa described in 1984